Ulysses 31 is an animated science fiction television series produced by DiC Entertainment. The show comprises 26 half-hour episodes which first aired between 1981 and 1982 on FR3. The following episode titles were used for the original French version as well as in the international version for Europe and North and Latin America. The order of episodes on the DVD release is different however.

 Notes

Japanese version 
A number of the episode titles in the Japanese version of Ulysses 31 were modified or simplified from the original French. The order in which the episodes aired also varied to some extent.

1. BBC Date-7 November 1985
2. BBC Date-14 November 1985
3. BBC Date-21 November 1985
4. BBC Date-28 November 1985
5. BBC Date-5 December 1985
6. BBC Date-12 December 1985
7. BBC Date-19 December 1985
8. BBC Date-2 January 1986
9. BBC Date-9 January 1986
10. BBC Date-16 January 1986
11. BBC Date-23 January 1986
12. BBC Date-30 January 1986
13. BBC Date-6 February 1986
14. BBC Date-13 February 1986
15. 20 February 1986
16. 27 February 1986
17. BBC Date-6 March 1986
18. BBC Date-13 March 1986
19. BBC Date-20 March 1986
20. BBC Date-27 March 1986 
21. BBC Date-3 April 1986
22. BBC Date-10 April 1986
23. BBC Date-17 April 1986
24. BBC Date-24 April 1986
25. BBC Date-1 May 1986
26. BBC Date-8 May 1986

References

External links 
 

Lists of French animated television series episodes
Lists of anime episodes